Thomas Simpson Woodward (February 22, 1797 – 1859) was a U.S. Army general who settled and named the area that developed into Tuskegee, Alabama. Late in life, he wrote letters about his experiences with and beliefs about American Indians.

Woodward was born in Elbert County, Georgia  around 1794 and was orphaned at a young age. He was raised by his mother and her brother.

He became a brigadier general in the Georgia militia and fought alongside Creek Indians.

He migrated west and established a plantation in Camden, Arkansas, a town he named. He later moved to Wheeling in Winn Parish, Louisiana and established a 16,000-acre plantation, which he named Montgomery after the capital city of Alabama. With James Dent he plotted land he owned and named it Tuskegee.

A collection of his letters was published in 1859 as Woodward's Reminiscences of the Creek, or Muscogee Indians, Contained in Letters to Friends in Georgia and Alabama, in Montgomery, Alabama. According to an introduction to his book he had a daughter with one of his slaves and moved to Louisiana.

He had a son named Thomas Woodward who was a colonel in Louisiana.

A painted portrait of Woodward is preserved by the Alabama Department of Archives and History.

References

1797 births
1859 deaths
19th-century American military personnel
People from Elbert County, Georgia
People from Camden, Arkansas
American planters
United States Army generals
Tuskegee, Alabama
People from Winn Parish, Louisiana
People from Tuskegee, Alabama
People of the Creek War